The Sulawesi horseshoe bat (Rhinolophus celebensis) is a species of bat in the family Rhinolophidae. It is endemic to Indonesia.

References

Rhinolophidae
Bats of Indonesia
Endemic fauna of Indonesia
Mammals of Sulawesi
Mammals described in 1905
Taxa named by Knud Andersen
Taxonomy articles created by Polbot